Wu River, originates in Xiangxiang City, is  long, and drains a basin of . It is the fourth largest river in Ningxiang City and one of the largest tributaries of the Wei River.

Wu River has 68 tributaries. The river passes places such as Huitang Town, Xieleqiao Town, Zifu Town, Nantianping Town, Batang Town, and Lijingpu Township, and empties into the Wei River in Nantai Lake.

References

Rivers of Changsha
Geography of Ningxiang